"A Girl Like You" is a song written by Ashley Gorley, Jesse Frasure, and Rhett Akins and recorded by American country music singer Easton Corbin. The song is Corbin's tenth single, and was originally intended to be the lead single from his upcoming fourth studio album before his termination from Mercury Nashville. The song is Corbin's first non-album single to date.

Content
The song features "a playful, chicken-picked guitar hook and a digitized, shuffling beat". Its lyrics deal with a woman with whom the narrator is affectionate. He compares her to "the nameless girl of many a recent Nashville hit", and states that she is unlike any other girl.

Commercial performance
The song has sold 150,000 copies in the United States as of February 2022.

Charts

Weekly charts

Year-end charts

References

2017 songs
2017 singles
Easton Corbin songs
Mercury Records singles
Songs written by Jesse Frasure
Songs written by Rhett Akins
Songs written by Ashley Gorley